is a district located in Shimane Prefecture, Japan.

As of 2003, the district has an estimated population of 16,253 and a density of 44.16 persons per km2. The total area is 368.06 km2.

Towns and villages
Okuizumo

Merger
On March 31, 2005, the towns of Nita and Yokota merged to form the new town of Okuizumo.

Districts in Shimane Prefecture